Here is a list of Hindu temples in Switzerland:

Zürich
 Arulmihu Sivan Temple, Glattbrugg
 Hare Krishna Temple
 Sri Sivasubramaniar Temple, Adliswil
 Sri Vishnu Thurkkai Amman Temple, Dürnten

Other locations
 Murugan Temple, Aarau
 Arulmigu Siddi Vinayakar Temple, Baar
 Haus der Religionen, Bern
 Sathya Sai Baba Center, Burgdorf
 Shirdi Sai Baba Temple, Thun
 Sri Rajeswari Ambal Temple, Basel
 Kalyaana Subramanya Swami Temple, Bern
 Sri Navasakthi Vinayagar Temple, Zizers
 Vinayagar Temple, Geneva
 Thurkai Amman Temple, Grenchen
 Sri Murugan Temple, Lausanne
 Amman Hindu Temple Luzern, Lucerne
 Shakthi Temple, Olten
 Hindu Temple, Renens
 Arulmigu Velaayudharswamy temple, St. Margrethen
 Shivasubramanya Swami Temple, Ticino
 Sri Manonmani Ampal Alayam, Trimbach
 Hindu Tempel Basel, Basel
 Somaskanda Ashram, Fideris - associated with Skanda Vale ashram in the United Kingdom

See Also: All Hindu Temples in Switzerland, their contact details and opening hours

See also
Religion in Switzerland
Hinduism in Switzerland
 Lists of Hindu temples by country
 List of Hindu temples outside India
 List of large Hindu temples

References

External Links 

Switzerland
Hindu temples in Switzerland
Hindu temples